Talu Sar Mahalleh (also Romanized as Talū Sar Maḩalleh; also known as Talosarmaḩalleh) is a village in Goli Jan Rural District, in the Central District of Tonekabon County, Mazandaran Province, Iran. At the 2006 census, its population was 218, in 56 families.

References 

Populated places in Tonekabon County